CareFlite is a nonprofit ambulance service based in Grand Prairie, Texas which operates throughout North and Central Texas. CareFlite's original namesake service is helicopter air ambulance, though today it also performs fixed-wing and ground transport.

CareFlite's Board of Directors includes representatives from Texas Health Resources, Methodist Health System, Baylor Scott & White Health Care System, Parkland Health and Hospital System, and the JPS Health Network.

History 
CareFlite began operations in 1979. It originated with one helicopter, a Bell 206L, which was shared between Methodist Dallas Medical Center and Harris Methodist Fort Worth Hospital. CareFlite augmented their air ambulance service with ground operations in 1981.

Fleet

Current aircraft 

CareFlite currently operates six helicopters, one fixed-wing aircraft, and several ground ambulances.
 2 Bell 429
 4 Bell 407GX
 1 Beech C90

Former aircraft 
 Agusta AW109
 Bell 222UT
 Bell 206L

Operations

Helicopter flight crew 
Each CareFlite helicopter is staffed by a pilot, a nurse, and a paramedic meeting the following minimum requirements:

Pilot 
 ATP Rotorcraft Certification
 2500 hours helicopter total time
 500 turbine flight hours
 200 unaided night-flight hours

Nurse 
 At least five years emergency room and/or intensive care unit experience
 Paramedic license or certification
 CFRN
 ACLS
 ATLS or TPATC
 PALS
 S.T.A.B.L.E.
 NRP
Paramedic
 At least 5 years progressive 9-1-1 experience
 FP-C
 ACLS
 ATLS or TPATC
 PALS
 S.T.A.B.L.E.
 NRP

Bases of operation

Helicopter 
 Methodist Dallas Medical Center
 Texas Health Harris Methodist Fort Worth Hospital
 McKinney National Airport
 North Texas Medical Center
 Granbury Regional Airport
 Whitney, Texas
 Burnet, Texas

Fixed-wing 
 Grand Prairie Municipal Airport

Ground 
 Collin County
 Dallas County
 Denton County
 Ellis County
 Erath County
 Hill County
 Johnson County
 Kaufman County
 Palo Pinto County
 Parker County

Accidents 
 On September 3, 2003, a CareFlite AW109 lost power while taking off from the Methodist Dallas Medical Center. The pilot aborted the takeoff, forcing the aircraft onto its side on the helipad to avoid going over the side of the building. The pilot was injured in the crash.
 On June 2, 2010, a CareFlite 222 was undergoing a post-maintenance flight near Midlothian, Texas when it broke up in the air. The pilot and the mechanic on board were both killed in the crash. The probable cause was found to be fracture of a swashplate drive pin.
 On September 30, 2012, a CareFlite AW109 dispatched on mission entered IFR conditions, shortly thereafter descending from the clouds. The aircraft impacted the ground at a level attitude, skidded and landed on its side. The three crew members were seriously injured.

Memberships 
As with some other air ambulance services, CareFlite offers yearly memberships to cover transport costs not paid by medical insurance. The membership costs are charged per household. This includes helicopter, ground, and most fixed-wing transport costs.

Fixed-wing transport 
If insurance deems a fixed-wing transport usage not medically necessary or denies claim, the member is responsible 50% of the charges.

Partnership with Air Methods 
CareFlite has membership reciprocity with Air Methods, a large helicopter company which operates many air ambulance programs throughout the United States. This allows members of Air Methods and CareFlite to benefit from their memberships if they require air medical transport in either companies' respective areas of operation.

See also 
 Memorial Hermann Life Flight
 Travis County STAR Flight

References

External links 
 CareFlite website
 Bringing Health and Hope – CareFlite Texas


Air ambulance services
Air ambulance services in the United States
Healthcare in Texas